Duobao Glazed Pagoda is a Chinese Buddhist pagoda at the back of Longevity Hill inside the Summer Palace of Beijing, China. It was built during the reign of the Qianlong Emperor (1735-1796) of the Qing Dynasty.  

The pagoda is mostly noteworthy for its decoration: it is completely covered in tiny glazed Buddhist statues. It has three stories, each with double or triple-layer eaves supported with brackets.

See also
 Jade Peak Pagoda
 List of pagodas in Beijing

External links
 

Buildings and structures in Beijing
Pagodas in China
Summer Palace (Beijing)
Buddhism in Beijing